is a Japanese former competitive figure skater. She is a two-time Winter Universiade champion and a six-time Japanese national champion. She finished 21st in the 1960 Winter Olympic Games, and 5th in the 1964 Winter Olympic Games.

After retiring from competition, Fukuhara became a coach. She is a member of the founding family of Shiseido.

Competitive highlights

References

1944 births
Living people
Japanese female single skaters
Olympic figure skaters of Japan
Figure skaters at the 1960 Winter Olympics
Figure skaters at the 1964 Winter Olympics
Sportspeople from Tokyo
Universiade medalists in figure skating
Universiade gold medalists for Japan
Competitors at the 1964 Winter Universiade
Competitors at the 1966 Winter Universiade